Don Coulton (17 January 1922 – 25 January 2000) was  a former Australian rules footballer who played with Footscray and North Melbourne in the Victorian Football League (VFL).

Notes

External links 
		

1922 births
2000 deaths
Australian rules footballers from Victoria (Australia)
Western Bulldogs players
North Melbourne Football Club players
Yarraville Football Club players